The Beaver Valley Rock Shelter Site is the only formally recognized cave in the US state of Delaware. It is located in New Castle County near Wilmington and the state line with Pennsylvania.

Up until the mid-twentieth century and despite ample historical evidence that Delaware Indians used it for shelter, the National Speleological Society maintained that Delaware was the only state in the union lacking a cave. In 1958, a local resident, George Jackson, added this cave to the national cave files. The cave was the focus of research in the 1940s when the Archeological Society of Delaware conducted a dig which revealed conclusively that native tribes (including Lenni Lenape) had used it for shelter and storage. Sitting just 100 feet from the Pennsylvania border this small cave extends just 56 feet to its furthest reach, but has become one of the most researched caves in the United States relative to its size. Jack Speece notes that the cave has gone by many names in its history. Indian Cave, Beaver Valley Rock Shelter, and Wolf Rock Cave preceded the now more commonly accepted "Beaver Valley Cave".

The site was listed on the National Register of Historic Places in 1978.

Not Formally Recognized or Lost Caves:

Delaware has 3 caves or rock shelters in total, however, Beaver Valley Rock Shelter Site is the only formally recognized cave by the National Speleological Society. There are two other caves in Delaware: Gaige’s Cave and the Brandywine Springs Cave. 

The Brandywine Springs cave was surveyed by The Delaware Geological Survey, but it is not recognized in any other publications. The Brandywine cave is in Brandywine Springs and is "approximately 100 yards east of the tracks is one of the largest outcrops in the park. Here along the hillside, a thick layer of crinkle-folded, yellow-weathering gneiss overlies a layer of garnet-bearing quartzite and amphibolite. At the contact between the quartzite and the schist, a large piece of the quartzite has fallen out creating a small cave. Maybe natives used this cave, but it is not very inviting. If you hit the black rocks with a hammer they will ring. Look for the tiny lavender garnets in the quartzite."- Delaware Geological Survey.

Gaige’s Cave is located 15 yards from Red Clay Creek on Mt. Cuba Road, Hockessin. It is not known if the Gaige’s Cave has been surveyed or officially recognized by any know geological publications. The name of the cave derives from the local who first documented it around 2020. The cave is small and is only approximately 15 feet deep.

Lost Caves or Rock Shelter Sites:

There are several documented caves or shelter sites that have been razed or disrupted. Publications from the 19th and 20th century have proven their once existence. All these sites are located in upper New Castle County. The best documented on is provided by Hilborne T. Cresson. He discovered many artifacts and bones of indigenous peoples at the destroyed Naamans Creek Rock Shelter site. The site was destroyed by the Baltimore and Ohio Railroad. Most of the artifacts and remains are in the possession of the Peabody Museum and other New England based organizations.

Dead Poet's Society

The cave is featured in the film Dead Poet's Society as the location of the titular group's meetings. The scenes featuring a cave, used a mix of shots from Banning Park in Wilmington, Beaver Valley Shelter Site, and recreated indoor sets.

See also
National Register of Historic Places listings in northern New Castle County, Delaware

References

Archaeological sites on the National Register of Historic Places in Delaware
New Castle County, Delaware
Caves of Delaware
National Register of Historic Places in New Castle County, Delaware